The 2022 season was Sri Pahang FC's 19th season in the Malaysia Super League since its inception in 2004. In addition to the domestic league, Sri Pahang also participated in the Malaysia FA Cup and the Malaysia Cup.

Players

First-team

Statistics

Appearances and goals

|-
|colspan="16"|Goalkeepers:
|-

|-
|colspan="16"|Defenders:
|-

|-
|colspan="16"|Midfielders:
|-

|-
|colspan="16"|Forwards:
|-

|-
! colspan=16 style=background:#dcdcdc; text-align:center| Players who left during the season but made an appearance
|-

|-

References

Sri Pahang FC
Sri Pahang FC seasons
2022 in Malaysian football
Sri Pahang